Antonín Absolon is a retired slalom canoeist who competed for Czechoslovakia in the mid-to-late 1960s. He won a silver medal in the mixed C-2 team event at the 1965 ICF Canoe Slalom World Championships in Spittal.

References

External links 
 Antonin ABSOLON at CanoeSlalom.net

Czechoslovak male canoeists
Possibly living people
Year of birth missing
Medalists at the ICF Canoe Slalom World Championships